is a former Japanese football player.

Playing career
Yokokawa was born in Yamanashi Prefecture on February 25, 1963. After graduating from Meiji University, he joined Fujita Industries in 1985. He became a regular goalkeeper from first season. The club won the 2nd place 1985 and 1988 Emperor's Cup. However he lost his opportunity to play behind Kiyoto Furushima from 1991. In 1992, he moved to Yokohama Marinos. However he could hardly play in the match behind Shigetatsu Matsunaga and retired end of 1994 season.

Club statistics

References

External links

1963 births
Living people
Meiji University alumni
Association football people from Yamanashi Prefecture
Japanese footballers
Japan Soccer League players
J1 League players
Shonan Bellmare players
Yokohama F. Marinos players
Association football goalkeepers